Bare is a solo album by Wayne Hussey, released in 2008. It contains a mixture of songs by the Mission and cover versions from bands including The Beach Boys and U2, plus one new song, "One Thing Leads to Another".

Track listing

"A Night Like This" (The Cure cover) – 3:40
"Keep It in the Family" – 4:53
"Black Mountain Mist" – 3:16
"With or Without You" (U2 cover) – 5:25
"Shelter from the Storm" – 3:53
"Garden of Delight" – 3:53
"God Only Knows" (The Beach Boys cover) – 4:00
"Absolution" – 4:51
"Stars Don't Shine without You" – 2:55
"My Funny Valentine" (cover version of the popular show tune from the musical Babes in Arms) – 3:20
"Bird of Passage" – 5:51
"Grotesque" – 5:34
"One Thing Leads to Another" – 4:47

Personnel
Produced, Engineered and mixed by Wayne Hussey
Cellos on "Grotesque"  arranged and performed by Caroline Dale and recorded by John Reynolds
Mastered by Maor Appelbaum

References

2008 debut albums